Allium punctum is a species of wild onion known by the common name dotted onion or Modoc onion. It is native to the western United States in and around the Modoc Plateau in northeastern California (Modoc County), northwestern Nevada (Humboldt County), and southeastern Oregon (Malheur, Lake and Harney Counties). It is uncommon, growing in volcanic flatlands created by old lava flows.

Description
Allium punctum grows from a yellow-brown to grayish oval-shaped bulb one or two centimeters wide. It produces a short stem no more than 10 centimeters tall and two sickle-shaped leaves which are usually a bit longer. The inflorescence bears up to 20 flowers which are white or pink with purple veining.

References

punctum
Onions
Flora of California
Flora of Nevada
Flora of Oregon
Flora of the Great Basin
~
Endemic flora of the United States
Plants described in 1930